is a railway station built underground in Nakagyo-ku, Kyoto, Kyoto, Japan. Hankyu Kyoto Line serves this station. Keifuku Electric Railroad Arashiyama Main Line terminus Shijō-Ōmiya Station locates nearby.

Layout 
The station has two side platforms.

Usage 
In fiscal 2015 (April 2015 to March 2016), about 11,537,000 passengers used this station annually. For historical data, see the table below.

History 
The station opened on 31 March 1931 as Keihan Kyoto Station of the Shinkeihan Line, then operated by Keihan Electric Railway. After the Shinkeihan Line became the Hankyu Kyoto Line, the station was called Hankyu Kyoto Station. Since 17 June 1963 when the Hankyu Kyoto Line was extended to Kawaramachi Station, the station is no longer terminus and is called Ōmiya Station, after the street name.

Station numbering was introduced to all Hankyu stations on 21 December 2013 with this station being designated as station number HK-84.

Adjacent stations

References

External links
 Ōmiya Station from Hankyu Railway website

Hankyu Kyoto Main Line
Buildings and structures in Kyoto
Railway stations in Kyoto
Railway stations in Japan opened in 1931